NGC 85 is an interacting spiral or lenticular galaxy estimated to be about 200 million light-years away in the constellation of Andromeda. It was discovered by Ralph Copeland in 1873 and its apparent magnitude is 15.7. The galaxy appears to be interacting with the companion spiral IC 1546.

References

External links
 

0085
Andromeda (constellation)
18731115
Discoveries by Ralph Copeland
Lenticular galaxies